Wool is a large village, civil parish and electoral ward in south Dorset, England. In the 2011 census the parish – which includes Bovington Camp army base to the north – had 2,015 households and a population of 5,310. The village lies at a historic bridging point on the River Frome, halfway between Dorchester and Wareham. Woolbridge Manor House, a 17th-century building, is a prominent feature just outside the village and the location of Tess's honeymoon in Thomas Hardy's Tess of the D'Urbervilles.  Other prominent features of the village include the medieval church of Holy Rood, the railway station on the South West Main Line from London Waterloo to Weymouth, and the thatched cottages along Spring Street.

The place-name 'Wool' is first attested in Anglo-Saxon Writs from 1002 to 1012, where it appears as Wyllon. In the Domesday Book of 1086 it appears as Wille and Welle, and as Welles in 1212 in the Book of Fees. The name means 'springs' in the sense of the related word wells.

Near Wool, to the east of the village, are the ruins of Bindon Abbey, which was demolished in the Dissolution of the Monasteries of 1539, the stone being used to build castles in Portland, Lulworth and Sandsfoot.

According to local knowledge, only one building was destroyed during the war – on 3 May 1941. The building was a small bungalow by the name of "Two Birches", located on Bailey's Drove. The house was later rebuilt.

A small single-lane hump-backed stone bridge, a Grade II* listed structure about 200m north from the railway station, is no longer used for vehicular traffic. The place name Wullebrigg, recorded in 1244, indicates a crossing here in the thirteenth century and there is an extant record from 1343 of a bridge crossing the River Frome at this point. It has a stone half-way along it stating that those who deface or damage the bridge will be transported (sent to Australia or another penal colony) for the rest of their lives. In January 2018 one of the bridge's stone parapets collapsed, undermined by floodwater, but the arches remained undamaged.

Local places of interest include The Tank Museum and Monkey World.
It also boasts surrounding hamlets, including East Burton and Giddy Green.

The village received significant media coverage in January 2012, after a fuel tanker crashed into the front of a bungalow, starting a fire. No-one was injured in the incident, but the tanker driver was arrested on suspicion of attempted murder. It received further media coverage in November 2018, when animal rights group PETA requested that the village be renamed Vegan Wool, claiming that the village's name "promotes hideous animal cruelty", despite its true origins. The county council agreed to debate the issue. In December 2018, the council appeared to mock PETA on Twitter after repairs were carried out on Wool Bridge following erosion, tweeting, "Look away veggie lovers, #Wool bridge is now looking meaty".

Notes

References
 Pitt-Rivers, Michael, 1968.  Dorset. London: Faber & Faber

External links

 Holy Rood Church Website

 Four decades in the life of a Wool village tree
 Wool Carnival

Villages in Dorset